Alexandre Charlet is a French actor.

Filmography

Plays 

 2021 : Et les oiseaux répandirent la couleur (Solo)
2015 : L’Opéra de quat’sous by Bertolt Brecht & Kurt Weill – Directed by Olivier Desbordes & Eric Perez
 2015 : Mon premier job (Solo) adapted from David Lodge's short story – Created under the watchful eyes of Gilbert Rouvière
 2015 : Mon Prof est un Troll by Dennis Kelly – Directed by Anaïs Coq
 2013 : Habillage ou la grisette nue by Sarah Fourage – Directed by Anna Delbos-Zamore
 2012 : Lost in the Stars (Musical) Music by Kurt Weill and book by Maxwell Anderson, based on the novel Cry, the Beloved Country by  Alan Paton – Directed by Olivier Desbordes
 2011 : Qui a peur de Virginia Woolf by Edward Albee – Directed by Jean-Louis Sol
 2011 : Paysage Moral (Solo) Mash-up of texts by Carlos Drumond de Andrade – Directed by Ferdinand Fortes
 2010 : Amphitryon(s) by Plaute, Kleist and others – Directed by Hervé Dartiguelongue
 2010 : Cairn by Enzo Cormann – Directed by Hélène Soulié
 2008 : Baal [1919]  by Bertolt Brecht – Directed by Mathias Beyler
 2008 : La Nuit des Camisards by Lionnel Astier – Directed by Gilbert Rouvière
 2008 : Scènes de chasse en Bavière  by Martin Sperr – Directed by Yves Ferry
 2007 : En Attendant que la neige tombe (Work in progress) – Directed by Jean-Baptiste Demarigny
 2006 : Ali Cogia, Marchant de Bagdad (Tales of the Arabian Nights) – Collective creation, Compagnie Biladi
 2006 : Poeub by Serge Valetti – Directed by Michel Didym
 2005 : Les Hommes de Terre by Marion Aubert – Directed by Richard Mitou

References 
 www.theatre-contemporain.net
 www.lesarchivesduspectacle.net

External links 
 

Living people
French male film actors
21st-century French male actors
Year of birth missing (living people)